Royal Air Force Hinaidi or more commonly known as RAF Hinaidi (or Hinaidi Cantonment), is a former Royal Air Force station near Baghdad in the Kingdom of Iraq. It was operational from 1922 until 1937, when operations were transferred to RAF Habbaniya.

History
Hinaidi Cantonment was developed after the First World War as an Army barracks and as the main British airfield, taking over from Baghdad West airfield. The Cantonment passed from British Army Command to the Royal Air Force in 1922 when the Royal Air Force took over garrison duties in Iraq as a result of the Cairo Conference.  There were extensive barracks, recreational facilities, a large hospital, Air Headquarters (AHQ), communication facilities, maintenance units, aeroplane squadron hangars, RAF Armoured Car Company lines, RAF Iraq Levies lines and a civil cantonment.  299 British personnel still lie buried in the RAF Cemetery at Hinaidi (the Peace Cemetery, derelict as at 2019 but subsequently being restored).  The register of those buried is held by the RAF Habbaniya Association.

In Clause 1 of the "Annexure to Treaty of Alliance" section of the Anglo-Iraqi Treaty of 1930, maintaining a force at Hinaidi was indicated to be permitted for a period of "five years after the entry into force of this Treaty."  This time was provided "in order to enable His Majesty the King of 'Iraq to organise the necessary forces to replace them."

RAF Dhibban (renamed RAF Habbaniya in 1938) was built to replace Hinaidi and the RAF began to move there in 1936. The final evacuation of British Forces from Hinaidi took place on 21 December 1937 and the handover of the entire cantonment to the Iraqi Government was completed on 17 January 1938. The Royal Iraqi Air Force had a presence on the airfield from at least 1933 and upon complete handover it became a major Royal Iraqi Air Force base.

During the 1941 Iraqi coup d'état, the airfield was renamed "Rashid Airfield" by the Iraqis in honour of Rashid Ali, former Iraqi Prime Minister and the leader of the coup. During the Anglo-Iraqi War in May 1941, the airfield was bombed and strafed by the British Royal Air Force, damaging and destroying Iraqi aircraft.

Flying Units and Aircraft
 No. 1 Squadron RAF (1921–1926) Sopwith Snipe Nighthawk
 No. 6 Squadron RAF (1922-1924) Bristol F2b Fighter
 No. 8 Squadron RAF (1921-1927) de Havilland Airco DH.9A
 No. 30 Squadron RAF (1922-1929) de Havilland Airco DH.9A Westland Wapiti
 No. 45 Squadron RAF (1922-1927) Vickers Vernon 
 No. 55 Squadron RAF (1924–1937) de Havilland Airco DH.9A Westland Wapiti
 No. 70 Squadron RAF (1922-1937) Vickers Vernon Vickers Victoria Vickers Valentia
The squadrons were also detached to other airfields during their time at Hinaidi.

A Communications Flight (with various designations) was posted to Hinaidi.

Units
 RAF Armoured Car Companies, various Companies, Sections and Wing Headquarters (1922-1936).

See also
 List of former Royal Air Force stations
 Handley Page Hinaidi

References

Citations

Bibliography

Alan Lake: FLYING UNITS OF THE RAF - The ancestry, formation and disbandment of all flying units from 1912 (Airlife, UK, 1999).
Air Vice Marshall A. G. Dudgeon CBE, DFC: "Hidden Victory - The Battle of Habbaniya, May 1941'' (Tempus Publishing, UK, 2000).

Hinaidi
Hinaidi
Military history of Iraq
Iraq–United Kingdom relations
Hin